Dove Lake can refer to:

 Dove Lake (Montgomery County, Pennsylvania)
 Dove Lake (Tasmania)